The 1830 warehouse, Liverpool Road, Manchester, is a 19th-century warehouse that forms part of the Liverpool Road railway station complex.  It was built in five months between April and September 1830, "almost certainly [to the designs of] the Liverpool architect Thomas Haigh".  The heritage listing report attributes the work to George Stephenson and his son, Robert. It has been listed Grade I on the National Heritage List for England since May 1973.

The warehouse is of "red brick in Flemish bond, with sandstone dressings and slate roofs". It is three storeys high, though only two storeys present to the level of the railway to allow for direct loading and unloading. At the ground floor at street level, carts could also gain direct access. "The internal structure is of timber, but with cast-iron columns in the basement."

The processing of goods within the warehouse was originally a manual operation but "steam-powered hoists [were] installed within a year as the manual system could not cope with the volume of goods".  The steam system of 1831 was replaced with a hydraulic system between 1866 and 1880 to increase efficiency.

The restoration of the warehouse was undertaken in 1992–6 by the Building Design Partnership.

See also

Grade I listed buildings in Greater Manchester
Listed buildings in Manchester-M60

Notes

References

Grade I listed buildings in Manchester
Commercial buildings completed in 1830
Grade I listed warehouses
Buildings and structures completed in 1830
Commercial buildings in Manchester
Warehouses in England
1830 establishments in England